Modern Heart is the second studio album by American rhythm and blues group Champaign, released in March 1983 via Columbia Records. The album did not chart in the United States, but the album's only official single "Try Again" peaked at #23 on the Billboard Hot 100.

Track listing

Notes

References

External links
 
 

1983 albums
Albums produced by George Massenburg
Champaign (band) albums
Columbia Records albums